Sancaklar Mosque is a mosque in Büyükçekmece, Istanbul, Turkey. It was designed by architect Emre Arolat. Finished in 2012, it received the 2015 Religious Building of the Year Award from ArchDaily. In the 2018 BBC series Civilisations, classicist Mary Beard described it as "one of the most striking  religious creations of modern times" and "one of the most startling mosques in the world".

References

2012 establishments in Turkey
Büyükçekmece
Mosques completed in 2012
21st-century religious buildings and structures in Turkey